Amjad Hossain (1924–1971) was a Bangladeshi statesman and Freedom Fighter.
Amjad Hossain is regarded as one of the influential and political figures in Pabna during Liberation War of Bangladesh in 1971, due to his leadership and organizing capability, he united the various political and civil forces of Bangladeshi nationalism in 1971.

Early life
Amjad Hossain was born in 1924 at Charsadirajpur under PS Kumarkhali District Kushtia, Later his father Sheikh Rafiq Uddin and mother Parijan Nessa permanently settled at Nurpur of Pabna town.

Education
Amjad Hossain started his education from Madrasa. Later he admitted to Pabna Zilla School. He completed his secondary education from Rangpur Carmichael College. Later he went Maulana Azad College, Kolkata and completed his Graduation.

Political career
Amjad Hossain came in contact with Huseyn Shaheed Suhrawardy when he was student. Shaheed Suhrawardy inspired him to get involved in politics that was how his political career began. He was an organiser of Bengali Language Movement in 1952 and had a contribution  in Language Movement.

The time when Huseyn Shaheed Suhrawardy became the Prime Minister of Pakistan he appointed young Amjad Hossain as his Political Secretary. For his persuasive capability and facing formidable challenges Amjad Hossain earned enormous faith and popularity within his party and of the people in general. He was elected as Member of the National Assembly of Pakistan twice in the years of 1962 and 1970. In 1970 election  he won the election against Maulana Abdus Sobhan.

Amjad Hossain was one of the pioneering Architect of Pabna district Awami league. A close confidante of Sheikh Mujibur Rahman, Amjad Hossain shouldered the charges of president of greater Pabna district Awami League in the late 1960s and early 1970s. He coordinated the Awami League's election campaign for the 1970 Pakistani general election in Pabna, in which the League gained a historic parliamentary majority to form government to the elected National Assembly.

Bangladesh Liberation War
Amjad Hossain was a political organiser before Bangladesh Liberation War in 1971. After the Pakistan Army launched Operation Searchlight in East Pakistan in March 1971, he, with other leaders started organizing people. Amjad Hossain, in compliance with directives of Sheikh Mujibur Rahman in his speech on 7 March 1971, framed strategies to fight. He sent a special envoy to the Government of West Bengal seeking military logistics because it seemed the Pakistani Political Crisis could no longer be solved peacefully.

Death
People's leader Amjad Hossain died on 6 April 1971.

Post-independence memorial
Amjad Hossain High School in Pabna is named after him

References

External links
 মুক্তিকামী মানুষদের সংগঠিত করেন আমজাদ হোসেন
 পাবনা:মুক্তিযুদ্ধ ও মুক্তিযোদ্ধা

Awami League politicians
People from Pabna District
Bengali language movement
1924 births
1971 deaths
People of the Bangladesh Liberation War
Pakistani MNAs 1962–1965
Mukti Bahini personnel